Svein Nyhus (born 23 January 1962) is a Norwegian illustrator and writer of children's books.

Svein Nyhus was born in Tønsberg as the twin brother of caricaturist Egil Nyhus. He took his education at the Norwegian National Academy of Craft and Art Industry from 1981 to 1985.

Svein Nyhus has illustrated his own texts as well as books by his wife, Norwegian poet Gro Dahle. His own books include
Drømmemaskinen ("The Dreammachine", 1995), 
Pappa! ("Daddy!", 1998), 
Verden har ingen hjørner ("The World Has No Corners", 1999), 
Lille Lu og Trollmannen Bulibar ("Little Lu And Bulibar The Wizard", 2001), 
Ingen ("Nobody", 2002) and Jeg! ("Me!", 2004), 
Opp og ut ("Up And Away", 2008) and
Sånt som er ("Things That Are", 2010).
 Lars (2011 - 2014)
 Skal vi leke? (Do you want to play? 2016)
 Steder å snakke om finans (Places to converse about finance, 2021)

His books have been translated into several languages; In 2004 he illustrated Why Kings and Queens Don't Wear Crowns, a picture book written by Princess Märtha Louise of Norway. In 2013 Svein Nyhus illustrated What Does the Fox Say?, a children's picture book based on Ylvis's YouTube hit The Fox. The book debuted before Christmas at number one on the New York Times Best Seller list. Nyhus also illustrated Sina Mann (Angryman, 2004), a picture book about a boy witnessing domestic violence, written by his wife Gro Dahle. It was published in English 2019.

References

External links

 Svein Nyhus' blog with summaries in English

1962 births
Living people
Norwegian illustrators
Norwegian children's book illustrators
Norwegian children's writers
Writers from Tønsberg
Norwegian twins
Oslo National Academy of the Arts alumni